Idrottsföreningen Kamraterna (English: Sporting Society Comrades), usually abbreviated IFK, is a central organisation for many sports clubs in Sweden. There are also eight IFK clubs in Finland but they are organised separately. The Swedish IFK was founded 1 February 1895 and has 164 member clubs with around 100,000 members as of 2004. The best known IFK club in football is probably the one in Gothenburg, IFK Göteborg, which won the UEFA Cup twice in the 1980s. In ice hockey, the most successful IFK club is IFK Helsingfors from Helsinki, which have won the Finnish championship seven times.

History 

IFK was founded in Stockholm by two young students (Louis Zettersten and Pehr Ehnemark) that wanted to create a sports association, consisting of a main club in Stockholm with smaller clubs in other parts of the country. This was in a time when no nationwide sports organization or other larger associations existed. An advertisement in the youth paper Kamraten (The Comrade) that was published 1 February 1895 called forth all sports interested boys and girls in Sweden to join the society. Less than two months later, clubs in Luleå, Härnösand, Uppsala, Jönköping, Gothenburg and Västerås had been founded, aside the main club in Stockholm. It was decided to name the society after the paper that made the creation possible.

The society grew fast and the administration was too heavy for IFK Stockholm to handle, so a central organisation was created in 1901. Championships and other activities for IFK clubs were arranged and were big tournaments in a time when there existed no central Swedish sports administration to handle nationwide events. Some of these Comrade championships died out as national championships were arranged, but in some sports they live on, for example in Bowling. Other member associations started their own competitions, the most notable being Vasaloppet arranged by IFK Mora and Lidingöloppet arranged by IFK Lidingö.

Aside from the IFK members in Sweden and the separately organised IFK members in Finland, there did also exist IFK associations in Denmark and Norway. The last active member in Denmark was IFK Aalborg that ceased to exist in the early 1990s, while the Norwegian member in Kristiania (Oslo) ended its activities early in the 20th century.

Symbols and colours 

IFK's colours are blue and white. They are used by almost all member clubs, and those clubs that do not use them have special permits from the central organisation for using other colours, like IFK Malmö that uses yellow and white or IFK Stockholm's blue and red kits. The colours are believed to symbolise innocence and loyalty as written, by the IFK society master, in Kamraten in 1899. Symbols used by IFK include the four-pointed star in blue or white, the blue shield with white stripe and the characteristically formed top with two rounded parts between three peaks which can be seen in most of the member clubs' badges, although some use other styles. The IFK flag is described as a blue and white Scandinavian cross on white background with a blue four-pointed star in the canton.

Noted clubs

Sweden

 IFK Eskilstuna
 IFK Göteborg
 IFK Kristianstad
 IFK Lidingö
 IFK Luleå
 IFK Malmö
 IFK Motala
 IFK Mora
 IFK Vänersborg
 IFK Norrköping
 IFK Stockholm
 IFK Uddevalla
 IFK Umeå
 IFK Värnamo
 IFK Växjö
 IFK Åmål

Finland

 Helsingfors IFK (commonly known as HIFK)
 IFK Mariehamn
 Vasa IFK (commonly known as VIFK)
 Åbo IFK (commonly known as ÅIFK)
 Grankulla IFK (commonly known as GrIFK)
 IFK Björneborg (1919–2017)

Achievements 

 Swedish football championships: 31
 IFK Göteborg 18
 IFK Norrköping 13
 IFK Eskilstuna 1
 Finnish Football Championships: 14
 IFK Helsingfors 7
 IFK Åbo 3
 IFK Vasa 3
 IFK Mariehamn 1
 UEFA Cup championships: 2
 IFK Göteborg 2
 Finnish Ice Hockey Championships: 7
 IFK Helsingfors 7
 Swedish Handball Championships: 9
 IFK Kristianstad 8
 IFK Lidingö 1
 Finnish Handball Championships: 11
 IFK Helsingfors 10
 IFK Grankulla 1
 Swedish Bandy Championships: 12
 IFK Uppsala 11
 IFK Motala 1
 Finnish Bandy Championships: 17
 IFK Helsingfors 17

External links 
 IFK Centralstyrelse - official site

Citations

Sources 
 IFK's historik
 

 
Sports governing bodies in Sweden
Sports organizations established in 1895
1895 establishments in Sweden